The Harvey Society is a learned society based in New York City, Named after the British scientist William Harvey (1578–1657), its scope is "the diffusion of knowledge of the medical sciences".  Since its founding in 1905, the society has sponsored an annual series of lectures given by leading biomedical researchers which it publishes in book form at the end of the year. The society's seven annual lectures are now held at Rockefeller University's Caspary Auditorium.

History
On 1 April 1905 a group of 13 prominent New York physicians and scientists met at 9 East 74th Street in the residence of physiologist Graham Lusk. Also in attendance was John J. Abel, a pharmacologist from the Johns Hopkins University School of Medicine. Their intention was to form a society which would forge a "closer relationship between the purely practical side of medicine and the results of laboratory investigation" by organizing a lecture series which would be open to physicians, scientists, and the general public.

The society's first meeting took place on October 7, 1905 in the Academy of Medicine with a lecture on the theory of narcosis by Hans Horst Meyer, Professor of Pharmacology at the University of Vienna. According to the New York Times, it was delivered in German. However, The English version of the lecture was printed in the society's first book of 13 lectures published in 1906 by J. B. Lippincott & Co.

In briefly reviewing the first 25 years of the Harvey Society Lectures, Rufus Cole wrote in 1930:

Founding officers and members
The society's founding officers were:
 Graham Lusk, President
 Simon Flexner, Vice President
 George B. Wallace, Secretary
 Frederick S. Lee, Treasurer

Other founding members included
 Samuel James Meltzer
 William H. Park
 Edward K. Dunham
 James Ewing
 Christian Herter
 Theodore C. Janeway
 Phoebus A. Levene
 Eugene Lindsay Opie

Other notable medical associations named after William Harvey 
The Harveian Society of London is a medical society founded in 1831 based in The Medical Society of London, Chandos Street, in Cavendish Square.

The Royal College of Physicians of London holds an annual lecture established by William Harvey in 1656 called the Harveian Oration.

The Harvey Club of London, the oldest medical club in Canada, was founded in 1919 and is based in the University of Western Ontario.

References

Medical associations based in the United States
Lecture series
Medical and health organizations based in New York (state)